Hybomitra frontalis is a species of horse flies in the family Tabanidae.

Distribution
Canada, United States

References

Tabanidae
Insects described in 1848
Diptera of North America
Taxa named by Francis Walker (entomologist)